"The Beauty in Black" is the first single released by Swedish heavy metal band Therion.

Track listing
 "Arrival of the Darkest Queen"
 "The Beauty in Black"
 "Evocation of Vovin"
 "The Veil of Golden Spheres"

Personnel
Christofer Johnsson - guitar, vocals, keyboards
Piotr Wawrzeniuk - drums
Fredrik Isaksson - bass guitar

Guest musicians
Hans Groning - bass-baritone vocals ("The Beauty in Black", "Evocation of Vovin")
Claudia Maria Mokri - soprano vocals ("The Beauty in Black", "Evocation of Vovin")

External links
 
 
 Information about single at the official website

Therion (band) songs
1995 singles
1995 songs
Nuclear Blast Records singles
Songs with lyrics by Thomas Karlsson